Més, also known as Més–Compromís, is a Valencian nationalist party in the Valencian Community, Spain. It is the largest party in the Coalició Compromís since 2021, being created as a refoundation of the former Bloc Nacionalista Valencià.

When created, the party had as objective the national and popular construction of the Land of Valencia, and improving the livelihood of the Valencian people. According to their promotors, the goal was to embrace a sobiranist discourse with popular roots that allows the new formation to have a better presence that Valencian Nationalist Bloc had. When it comes to the Valencian nationalist discourse, it promoted a more simplified vision of their ideology, receiving internal criticism.

Background 
After a traumatic Spanish transition to democracy, Valencian nationalism became an extraparlamentary force when the Valencian Autonomous Community was created in 1982. This led to the main nationalist party, the Valencian People's Union, to moderate their positions in an attempt to find accommodation in the new political system. This accommodation would led to the birth of the Valencian Nationalist Bloc, in a process known as Third Way,  where the involvement of Valencian Nationalists into Catalan issues, that had been vague but real since the emergence of Joan Fuster as an intellectual leader, was abandoned and substituted by a discourse strictly based on the Land of Valencia. The failure of the Valencian Nationalist Bloc of reaching the parliament in the 2003 Valencian regional election, would led them to explore electoral coalitions with other leftists forces, in a process that would lead to the birth of Coalició Compromís.

During the process, the formation would evolve from a strict Valencian nationalism to a civic nationalism less centered on elements as language, culture, and history, understanding that Valencianism is originated in the will of the individuals. Also, Compromís become a catch-all party, and joined the Valencian government in 2015.

After the 2019 Valencian regional election, leaders of the Valencian Nationalist Bloc had a refundation in mind, justified by a need of abandoning the original name, regarded as not very atractive for the voters, and an adaptation to the ideological changes experimented during the last decade. The refundation was expected to happen in June, 2020, but the Covid-19 pandemic delayed the congress until 2021.

The refoundation happened in June 2021, despite receiving internal criticism for what had been regarded as an ideological renunciation. In November 2021, former president of both UPV and Bloc, Pere Mayor, announced he had left the party.

References 

Left-wing political party alliances
Left-wing nationalist parties
Political parties in Spain
2021 establishments in Spain